Huỳnh Quang Thanh (born October 10, 1984 in Hồ Chí Minh City, Vietnam) is a Vietnamese footballer who was a defender for Long An. He was also the captain of the Vietnam national football team. He retired in 2018.

International goal
Scores and results list Vietnam's goal tally first.

Achievement

ASEAN Football Championship
Champion: 2008
Third Place: 2007

Bình Dương F.C.
V-League
Champion : 2007, 2008
Runner-up : 2006

References

External links
Player's profile at Becamex Bình Dương's website.
Player's profile at www.tuoitredatquang.com (in vietnamese)

1984 births
Living people
Sportspeople from Ho Chi Minh City
Vietnamese footballers
Association football defenders
2007 AFC Asian Cup players
Footballers at the 2006 Asian Games
Becamex Binh Duong FC players
Long An FC players
V.League 1 players
Asian Games competitors for Vietnam
Vietnam international footballers